Lipid II:glycine glycyltransferase (N-acetylmuramoyl-L-alanyl-D-glutamyl-L-lysyl-D-alanyl-D-alanine-diphosphoundecaprenyl-N-acetylglucosamine:N6-glycine transferase, femX (gene)) is an enzyme with systematic name alanyl-D-alanine-diphospho-ditrans, octacis-undecaprenyl-N-acetylglucosamine:glycine N6-glycyltransferase. This enzyme catalyses the following chemical reaction

 N-acetylmuramoyl-L-alanyl-D-isoglutaminyl-L-lysyl-D-alanyl-D-alanine-diphospho-ditrans,octacis-undecaprenyl-N-acetylglucosamine + glycyl-tRNA  N-acetylmuramoyl-L-alanyl-D-isoglutaminyl-L-lysyl-(N6-glycyl)-D-alanyl-D-alanine-diphospho-ditrans,octacis-undecaprenyl-N-acetylglucosamine + tRNA

The enzyme from Staphylococcus aureus catalyses the transfer of glycine from a charged tRNA to lipid II or N-acetylmuramoyl-L-alanyl-D-isoglutaminyl-L-lysyl-D-alanyl-D-alanine-diphosphoundecaprenyl-N-acetylglucosamine.

References

External links 
 

EC 2.3.2